Psychogrotesque is the fifth studio album by the Italian industrial black metal band Aborym.

The album was recorded, mixed and mastered at Fear No One Studios by Emiliano Natali, with the sound consulting of Marc Urselli (founder of The M.E.M.O.R.Y. Lab and sound engineer for artists like John Zorn, Laurie Anderson, Lou Reed, Eric Clapton) at the Eastside Sound Studios in New York.

Track listing

Personnel

Aborym
Malfeitor Fabban - Vocals, Bass, Keyboards
Hell:I0:Kabbalus - Guitars, Keyboards
Bård G. "Faust" Eithun - Drums

Additional
Karyn Crisis - Additional Vocals (3, 6, 10) [Crisis, Gawk]
Davide Tiso - Additional Guitars (2 intro, 9, 10 outro) [ Ephel Duath, Parched ]
Richard K. Szabo - Additional Electronics (9) [T.W.Z.]
Marc "M.E.M.O.R.Y. Lab" Urselli - Additional Music (3), Beat Production (3) [The M.E.M.O.R.Y. Lab]
Giulio Moschini - Guitar Solo (10) [Hour Of Penance]
Pete Michael Kolstad Vegem - Guitar Solo (10) [ Blood Tsunami ]
Emiliano Natali - Guitar Solo (2L), Additional Bass, Falsettos
Narchost - Additional Industrial Samples (5)
Marcello Balena - Saxophone (5, 6)

References

References 

2010 albums
Aborym albums
Season of Mist albums